is a 1981 arcade video game developed and published by Nintendo. As Mario, the player runs and jumps on platforms and climbs ladders to ascend a construction site and rescue Pauline from the titular giant gorilla. It is the first game in the Donkey Kong series as well as Mario's first appearance in a video game.

Donkey Kong is the product of Nintendo's efforts to develop a hit to rival Pac-Man (1980) and break into the North American market. Hiroshi Yamauchi, Nintendo's president at the time, assigned the project to first-time video game designer Shigeru Miyamoto. Drawing from a wide range of inspirations including Popeye, Beauty and the Beast, and King Kong, Miyamoto developed the scenario and designed the game alongside chief engineer Gunpei Yokoi. They broke new ground by using graphics as a means of characterization, including cutscenes to advance the game's plot and integrating multiple stages into the gameplay.

Although Nintendo's American staff was initially apprehensive, Donkey Kong succeeded commercially and critically in Japan and North America, where it became the highest-grossing 1981 and 1982, respectively. It was ported to the Game & Watch, selling  units, while Nintendo licensed the game to Coleco, a developer of arcade conversions for home consoles, selling  cartridges; the game's various ports sold more than  units worldwide. Other companies cloned the game and avoided royalties altogether. Miyamoto's characters were mass marketed in multitudes of products, including breakfast cereal, toys, and television cartoons. Universal City Studios filed a lawsuit alleging Donkey Kong violated its trademark of King Kong, ultimately failing.

The success of Donkey Kong positioned the company for market dominance from 1981 through the late 1990s. The game debuts Mario, who became Nintendo's mascot and one of the world's most recognizable characters. Donkey Kong pioneered the platform game genre before the term existed, is one of the most important games from the golden age of arcade video games, and one of the most popular arcade games of all time.

Gameplay

Following 1980's Space Panic, Donkey Kong is one of the earliest examples of the platform game genre, even prior to the term being coined; the U.S. gaming press used 'climbing game' for games with platforms and ladders. As the first platform game to feature jumping, Donkey Kong requires the player to jump between gaps and over obstacles or approaching enemies, setting the template for the future of the genre. With its four unique stages, Donkey Kong is the most complex arcade game of the time, and one of the first arcade games with multiple stages, following games such as 1980's Phoenix and 1981's Gorf and Scramble.

In addition to the goal of saving Pauline, the player has a score. Points are awarded for the following: leaping over obstacles; destroying objects with a hammer power-up; collecting items such as hats, parasols, and purses; removing rivets from platforms; and completing each stage according to a steadily decreasing bonus counter. The player starts with three lives with a bonus life awarded at 7,000 points. A life is lost when Mario touches Donkey Kong or any enemy object, falls too far, or lets the bonus counter reach zero. The game ends when all lives are lost.

Each of the four single-screen stages represents 25 meters of the structure Donkey Kong has climbed: 25, 50, 75, and 100 meters. Stage one involves Mario scaling a construction site made of crooked girders and ladders while jumping over or hammering barrels and oil drums tossed by Donkey Kong. Stage two involves climbing a five-story structure of conveyor belts, each of which transport cement pans. The third stage involves the player riding elevators while avoiding bouncing springs. The final stage requires Mario to remove eight rivets from the platforms supporting Donkey Kong; this causes Donkey Kong to fall and the hero to be reunited with Pauline. These four stages combine to form one level.

After each level, the stages repeat with increased difficulty. For example, Donkey Kong begins to hurl barrels faster and sometimes diagonally, and fireballs speed up. The victory music alternates between levels 1 and 2. The fourth level consists of 5 stages with the final stage at 125 meters. The level 130 is colloquially known as the kill screen, due to a programming error that kills Mario after a few seconds, effectively ending the game.

Competition

The 2007 documentary The King of Kong: A Fistful of Quarters portrays Steve Wiebe's attempts to break the Donkey Kong world record, then considered to have been held by Billy Mitchell. In the early 2010s, Hank Chien set a record of 1,138,600 points. This was broken four years later by Robbie Lakeman. Lakeman's record was then broken by John McCurdy on January 11, 2021, with a score of 1,272,700. Lakeman would reclaim the world record only five months later on June 8, scoring 100 more points than McCurdy.

In 2018, Mitchell was stripped of his records by Twin Galaxies and banned from submitting new scores after Twin Galaxies concluded that Mitchell had illicitly used emulators to achieve his scores. Twin Galaxies prohibits the use of emulators for high scores they publish because they allow undetectable cheating. However, in 2020 Guinness World Records reversed its decision and reinstated Billy Mitchell's previous world records, based on new evidence including eyewitness reports and expert testimonials.

There are other world record categories for Donkey Kong besides highest score. One of the most popular is the "No Hammer Challenge" where competitors try to get the highest score without using the hammer found in the game. The current world record in this category was set by Jeff Wolfe on July 8, 2008, with a score of 735,100. Some other categories include most points for different levels, and fewest points.

Plot

Donkey Kong is considered to be the earliest video game with a storyline that visually unfolds on screen. The eponymous Donkey Kong character is the game's de facto villain. The hero is a carpenter originally unnamed in the Japanese arcade release, later named Jumpman, and then Mario. Donkey Kong kidnaps Mario's girlfriend, originally known as Lady and later renamed Pauline. The player must take the role of Mario and rescue her. This is the first occurrence of the damsel in distress scenario that provided the template for countless video games released after.

The game uses graphics and animation for characterization. Donkey Kong smirks upon Mario's demise. Pauline has a pink dress and long hair, and a speech balloon crying "HELP!". Mario, depicted in red overalls and a red cap, is an everyman character, a type common in Japan. Graphical limitations and the low pixel resolution of the small sprites prompted his design. A mustache implies a mouth, a cap obviates the animation of hair, and colored overalls distinguish his arm movements. The artwork of the cabinets and promotional materials make these cartoon-like character designs even more explicit. Pauline, for example, is depicted as disheveled like King Kongs Fay Wray in a torn dress and stiletto heels.

Like Pac-Man (1980), Donkey Kong has cutscenes, but innovates by advancing a complete plot. The game opens with the gorilla climbing a pair of ladders to the top of a construction site, accompanied by a variation on the musical theme from Dragnet. He drops Pauline and stomps his feet, warping the steel beams. He moves to his final perch and sneers. A melody plays, and the level starts. This brief animation sets the scene and adds background to the gameplay, a first for video games. At the stage, a heart appears between Mario and Pauline, but Donkey Kong grabs her and climbs higher, causing the heart to break. The narrative concludes when Mario reaches the end of the rivet stage. He and Pauline are reunited, and a short intermission plays.

Development

Nintendo of America was founded in 1980 with minor success at importing its parent's arcade cabinets from Japan. In early 1981, its president Minoru Arakawa bet the small startup company on a major order of 3,000 Radar Scope. Its poor reception in America filled a warehouse with 2,000 unsold Radar Scope machines, so Arakawa requested that the parent company president Hiroshi Yamauchi send a conversion kit of new game software. Yamauchi polled the company's entire talent pool for fresh game design concepts to save the distressed startup. This yielded Shigeru Miyamoto's debut as lead game designer of his Donkey Kong concept, and Yamauchi appointed head engineer Gunpei Yokoi as project supervisor with a budget of  according to Miyamoto.

Ikegami Tsushinki was subcontracted for some of the development, with no role in the game's creation or concept, but to provide "mechanical programming assistance to fix the software created by Nintendo". Nintendo instructed Ikegami to produce a program according to its instructions and put it onto read-only memory (ROM) chips on printed circuit boards (PC boards). This later led to mutual lawsuits in 1983, as Ikegami asserted ownership over Donkey Kong which Nintendo denied as Ikegami was a subcontractor who had already been paid. Game Machine called it "simply a nuisance tactic" on the part of Ikegami.

At the time, Nintendo was also pursuing a license to make a game based on the Popeye comic strip. When this license attempt failed, Nintendo took the opportunity to create new characters that could be marketed and used in later games. Miyamoto came up with many characters and plot concepts, but he settled on a love triangle between a gorilla, a plumber with a large hammer, and a girlfriend that mirrors the rivalry between Bluto and Popeye for Olive Oyl. Bluto became an ape, which Miyamoto said was "nothing too evil or repulsive". He would be the pet of the main character, "a funny, hang-loose kind of guy". Miyamoto has named "Beauty and the Beast" and the 1933 film King Kong as influences. Although its origin as a comic strip license played a major part, Donkey Kong marked the first time that the storyline for a video game preceded the game's programming rather than simply being appended as an afterthought. An unrelated game was released by Nintendo for the Game & Watch the following month, as well as a game called Popeye for arcades in 1982.

Yamauchi wanted primarily to target the North American market, so he mandated that the game be given an English title, as with many previous Nintendo games. Miyamoto decided to name the game for the ape, who he said was the strongest character. The story of how Miyamoto came up with the name "Donkey Kong" varies. A false urban myth says that the name was originally meant to be "Monkey Kong", but was misspelled or misinterpreted due to a blurred fax or bad telephone connection. Another, more credible story claims Miyamoto looked in a Japanese-English dictionary for something that would mean "stubborn gorilla", or that "Donkey" was meant to convey "silly" or "stubborn"; "Kong" was common Japanese slang for "gorilla". A rival claim is that he worked with Nintendo's export manager to come up with the title, and that "Donkey" was meant to represent "stupid and goofy". In 2001, Miyamoto stated that he thought the name would convey the thought of a "stupid ape".

Miyamoto had high hopes for his new project. He was not a programmer, so instead consulted technicians for concept feasibility. He wanted to make the characters different sizes, and have different movements and reactions. Yokoi thought Miyamoto's original design was too complex, though he had some difficult suggestions, such as using see-saws to catapult the hero across the screen which was eventually found too hard to program, though a similar concept came later in the Popeye arcade game. Miyamoto then thought of using sloped platforms, barrels, and ladders. When he specified that the game would have multiple stages, the four-man programming team complained that he was essentially asking them to implement the game repeatedly. Nevertheless, they followed Miyamoto's design, creating a total of approximately 20 kilobytes of content. Yukio Kaneoka composed a soundtrack to serve as background music for the levels and story events.

The circuit board of Radar Scope was restructured for Donkey Kong. The Radar Scope hardware, originally inspired by the Namco Galaxian hardware, was designed for a large number of enemies moving around at high speeds, which Donkey Kong does not require, so the development team removed unnecessary functions and reduced the scale of the circuit board. The gameplay and graphics were reworked for updated ROM chips, and the existing CPU, sound hardware, and monitor were left intact. The character set, scoreboard, upper HUD display, and font are almost identical to Radar Scope, with palette differences. The Donkey Kong hardware has the memory capacity for displaying 128 foreground sprites at 16x16 pixels each and 256 background tiles at 8x8 pixels each. Mario and all moving objects use single sprites, the taller Pauline uses two sprites, and the larger Donkey Kong uses six sprites.

Hiroshi Yamauchi thought the game was going to sell well and phoned to inform Arakawa. Nintendo of America's distributors, Ron Judy and Al Stone, brought Arakawa to a lawyer named Howard Lincoln to secure a trademark.

The game was sent to Nintendo of America for testing. The sales manager disliked it for being too different from the maze and shooter games common at the time, and Judy and Lincoln expressed reservations over the strange title. Still, Arakawa adamantly believed that it would be a hit. American staff began translating the storyline for the cabinet art and naming the characters. They chose "Pauline" for the Lady, after Polly James, wife of Nintendo's warehouse manager Don James. Arakawa suggested that the name of "Jumpman", a name originally chosen for its similarity to the popular brands Walkman and Pac-Man, be changed to "Mario" in likeness of Mario Segale, the landlord of the original office space of Nintendo of America. These character names were printed on the American cabinet art and used in promotional materials. Donkey Kong was ready for release.

Stone and Judy convinced the managers of two bars in Seattle, Washington, to set up Donkey Kong machines. The managers initially showed reluctance, but when they saw sales of $30 a day—or 120 plays—for a solid week, they requested more units. In their Redmond headquarters, a skeleton crew composed of Arakawa, his wife Yoko, James, Judy, Phillips, and Stone gutted 2,000 surplus Radar Scope machines and applied the Donkey Kong conversion kits imported from Japan, consisting of motherboards, power supplies, and marquee graphics. The game officially went on sale in July 1981.

Release
Makers of video game consoles were interested. Taito offered a considerable fee for all rights to Donkey Kong, but Nintendo declined after three days of internal discussion. Rivals Coleco and Atari approached Nintendo in Japan and the United States respectively. In the end, Yamauchi granted Coleco exclusive console and tabletop rights to Donkey Kong because he believed that "it [was] the hungriest company". In addition, Arakawa believed that as a more established company in the U.S., Coleco could better handle marketing. In return, Nintendo received an undisclosed lump sum plus $1.40 per game cartridge sold and $1 per tabletop unit. On December 24, 1981, Howard Lincoln drafted the contract. He included language that Coleco would be held liable for anything on the game cartridge, an unusual clause for a licensing agreement. Arakawa signed the document the next day, and, on February 1, 1982, Yamauchi persuaded the Coleco representative in Japan to sign without review by the company's lawyers.

Coleco did not offer the game cartridge stand-alone; instead, it was bundled with the ColecoVision console, which went on sale in August 1982. Coleco offered Atari 2600 and Intellivision versions as well. Coleco's Atari 2600 port was programmed by Garry Kitchen. Coleco's sales doubled to $500 million and its earnings quadrupled to $40 million. Coleco also released stand-alone Mini-Arcade tabletop versions of Donkey Kong, along with Pac-Man, Galaxian, and Frogger in 1982. Coleco also bundled a copy of Donkey Kong with its Atari VCS clone, the Coleco Gemini, in 1983.

Atari obtained the license for home computer versions of Donkey Kong and released it for the Atari 8-bit family. When Coleco unveiled the Adam Computer, running a port of Donkey Kong at the 1983 Consumer Electronics Show in Chicago, Illinois, Atari protested that it was in violation of the licensing agreement. Yamauchi demanded that Arnold Greenberg, Coleco's president, withdraw his Adam port. Greenberg complied, and the game was not published.

Nintendo Entertainment System
The game was ported by Nintendo Research & Development 2 to Nintendo's Family Computer (Famicom) console and released in Japan on July 15, 1983, as one of the system's three launch games. Masayuki Uemura, the Famicom's lead architect, designed the console specifically to faithfully recreate Donkey Kong. It is an early Nintendo Entertainment System game in the Arcade Classics Series, released on June 1, 1986, in North America and October 15 in Europe. Omitted are the cement factory stage and most of the cutscenes, because early ROM cartridges do not have enough memory. It includes a new song composed by Yukio Kaneoka for the title screen. Both Donkey Kong and its sequel, Donkey Kong Jr., are included in the 1988 NES compilation Donkey Kong Classics.

Game Boy

A complete remake of the original arcade game on the Game Boy, titled Donkey Kong (referred to as Donkey Kong '94 during development) contains levels from both the original Donkey Kong and Donkey Kong Jr. arcades. It starts with the same gameplay and four locations as the arcade game and then progresses to 97 additional puzzle-based levels. It is the first game to have built-in enhancement for the Super Game Boy system.

Atari computer Easter egg
The Atari 8-bit computer conversion of Donkey Kong contains one of the longest-undiscovered Easter eggs in a video game. Programmer Landon Dyer's initials appear if the player dies under certain conditions and returns to the title screen. This remained undiscovered for 26 years until Dyer revealed it on his blog, stating that "there's an Easter egg, but it's totally not worth it, and I don't remember how to bring it up anyway". The steps required to trigger it were later discovered by Don Hodges, who used an emulator and a debugger to trace through the game's code.

Reception

Upon release in arcades, Computer and Video Games compared it favorably with King Kong and predicted that it would likely become a success. In his 1982 book Video Invaders, Steve Bloom described Donkey Kong as "another bizarre cartoon game, courtesy of Japan" and said it was one of the "most exciting variations" on Pac-Mans maze theme along with Sega's Frogger due to how players need to "scale from the bottom of the screen to the top" which make them "more like obstacle courses than mazes" since "you always know where you're going — up". In January 1983, the 1982 Arcade Awards gave it the award for the best single-player video game and the Certificate of Merit as runner-up for Coin-Op Game of the Year.

In September 1982, Arcade Express reviewed the ColecoVision port and scored it 9 out of 10. Creative Computing Video & Arcade Games in 1983 stated that "Coleco did a fabulous job" with Donkey Kong, the best of the console's first five games and "the most faithful adaptation of the original video game I have seen". The magazine's Danny Goodman stated that of Coleco's three console versions, the one for the ColecoVision was the best, followed by Atari and Intellivision. Computer and Video Games reviewed the ColecoVision port in its September 1984 issue and scored it 4 out of 4 in all four categories of Action, Graphics, Addiction and Theme. Ed Driscoll reviewed the Atari VCS version of Donkey Kong in The Space Gamer No. 59. Edwards commented that a game is near perfect and that anyone can be caught in Donkey Kong "fever".

Commercial performance
Donkey Kong was popular worldwide, garnering a positive reaction from consumers, and was a significant commercial success for Nintendo, pulling them out of financial troubles. After the game's initial 2,000 arcade cabinets sold out, more orders were made. Arakawa began manufacturing the electronic components in Redmond because waiting for shipments from Japan was taking too long. The game's success led to Arakawa expanding Nintendo of America. By October, Donkey Kong was selling 4,000 units a month, and by June 1982, Nintendo had sold 60,000 Donkey Kong machines in the United States, earning $180 million. Judy and Stone, who worked on straight commission, became millionaires. Arakawa used Nintendo's profits to buy  of land in Redmond in July 1982. Nintendo earned another $100 million on the game in its second year of release in America, totaling $280 million in US cabinet sales by 1982.

In Japan, the annual Game Machine charts listed Donkey Kong as the highest-grossing arcade game of 1981, and then the sixth highest-grossing arcade game of 1982, with Game Machine later listing the game in its October 1, 1983 issue as the twentieth most successful table arcade cabinet of the month. In the United States, Donkey Kong topped the Play Meter arcade charts in October 1981, setting a weekly earnings record, and it was later listed by RePlay as the highest-grossing arcade game of 1982. It was also among the thirteen highest-grossing arcade games of 1983 in the United States. According to Electronic Games in June 1983, the home versions contributed to the arcade version's extended popularity, compared to the four to six months that the average game lasted. It remained Nintendo's top seller into mid-1983, with steady sales in Japan. A total of 65,000 arcade units were sold in Japan, and 67,000 arcade units in the United States, for a total of  arcade units sold in Japan and the United States.

Nintendo's Game & Watch handheld version of Donkey Kong released in 1982 sold  units. It was also one of the earliest cartridges available for video game rental at certain stores in 1982. Coleco's Mini-Arcade tabletop versions of Donkey Kong, along with Pac-Man, Galaxian, and Frogger, had combined sales of three million units. In Japan, 840,000 units of the Famicom version were sold; the Famicom Mini version for the Game Boy Advance later had a further 160,000 units sold, for a total of  units sold in Japan. The Atari 8-bit computer version sold  units in 1986 and 1990. This totals  units sold worldwide for the Game & Watch, ColecoVision, Atari and Famicom ports. , all versions of the original Donkey Kong are estimated to have grossed  in revenue.

Reviews
Games

Legal issues

In April 1982, Sid Sheinberg, a seasoned lawyer and president of MCA and Universal City Studios, learned of the game's success and suspected it might be a trademark infringement of Universal's own King Kong. On April 27, he met with Arnold Greenberg of Coleco and threatened to sue over Coleco's home version of Donkey Kong. Coleco agreed on May 3 to pay royalties to Universal of 3% of their Donkey Kongs net sale price, worth about $4.6 million. Meanwhile, Sheinberg revoked Tiger's license to make its King Kong game, but O. R. Rissman refused to acknowledge Universal's claim to the trademark. When Universal threatened Nintendo, Howard Lincoln and Nintendo refused to cave. In preparation for the court battle ahead, Universal agreed to allow Tiger to continue producing its King Kong game as long as they distinguished it from Donkey Kong.

Universal sued Nintendo on June 29, and announced its license with Coleco. The company sent cease and desist letters to Nintendo's licensees, all of which agreed to pay royalties to Universal except Milton Bradley and Ralston Purina. Universal City Studios, Inc. v. Nintendo, Co., Ltd. was heard in the United States District Court for the Southern District of New York by Judge Robert W. Sweet. Over seven days, Universal's counsel, the New York firm Townley & Updike, argued that the names King Kong and Donkey Kong were easily confused and that the plot of the game was an infringement on that of the films. Nintendo's counsel, John Kirby, countered that Universal had themselves argued in a previous case that King Kongs scenario and characters were in the public domain. Judge Sweet ruled in Nintendo's favor, awarding the company Universal's profits from Tiger's game ($56,689.41), damages and attorney's fees.

Universal appealed, trying to prove consumer confusion by presenting the results of a telephone survey and examples from print media where people had allegedly assumed a connection between the two Kongs. On October 4, 1984, however, the court upheld the previous verdict.

Nintendo and its licensees filed counterclaims against Universal. On May 20, 1985, Judge Sweet awarded Nintendo $1.8 million for legal fees, lost revenues, and other expenses, but he denied Nintendo's claim of damages from those licensees who had paid royalties to both Nintendo and Universal. Both parties appealed this judgment, but the verdict was upheld on July 15, 1986.

Nintendo thanked John Kirby with the gift of a $30,000 sailboat named Donkey Kong and "exclusive worldwide rights to use the name for sailboats". Kirby, the titular protagonist of the Kirby series, was named in John Kirby's honor. The court battle also taught Nintendo they could compete with larger entertainment industry companies.

After the release of Donkey Kong Jr., the arcade successor to Donkey Kong, Ikegami sued Nintendo for the unauthorized duplication of the Donkey Kong program code. Nintendo managed to settle the dispute out of court after the two companies came to an agreement. At the time of the suit, computer programs were not considered copyrightable material. The Tokyo High Court gave a verdict in 1989 that acknowledged the originality of program code. Ikegami and Nintendo reached a settlement the following year; the terms of it were never disclosed.

Legacy
In 1996 Next Generation listed the arcade, Atari 7800, and cancelled Coleco Adam versions as number 50 on their "Top 100 Games of All Time", commenting that even ignoring its massive historical significance, Donkey Kong stands as a great game due to its demanding challenges and graphics which manage to elegantly delineate an entire scenario on a single screen. In February 2006, Nintendo Power rated it the 148th best game made on a Nintendo system. In 2017, The Strong National Museum of Play inducted Donkey Kong to its World Video Game Hall of Fame. Today, Donkey Kong is the fifth most popular arcade game among collectors.

Impact
Donkey Kong spawned a number of other titles with a mix of running, jumping and vertical traversal, a novel genre that did not match the style of games that came before it. The genre was initially referred to as "Donkey Kong-type" or "Kong-style" games, before the genre eventually came to be known as platform games. The game was also a milestone in terms of video game storytelling and cutscenes. While there were earlier games that either told a story or used cutscenes, Donkey Kong combined both concepts together to introduce its own new concept: using cutscenes to visually advance a complete story. It also notably had multiple, distinct levels that progressed the storyline.

Donkey Kong was also one of the first Japanese games brought to Western regions that introduced a surreal concept using cute artwork, a representation of typical Japanese fantasy but unusual to Western audiences. For that reason, Donkey Kong and similar games that followed were briefly called "novelty games" by Western gaming press. Donkey Kong and other such novelty games helped to acclimate Western audiences to Japanese approaches to game design, narrative, and abstraction that would become key elements in the decade that followed with the release of the Famicom/Nintendo Entertainment System.

Computer and Video Games called Donkey Kong "the most momentous" release of 1981, as it "introduced three important names" to the global video game industry: Nintendo, Shigeru Miyamoto, and Mario. These three figures went on to play a significant role in video game history. Donkey Kong paved the way for the Nintendo Entertainment System (NES), known as the Famicom in Japan. Following the success of Donkey Kong, Nintendo began developing the Famicom, the hardware of which was largely based on the Donkey Kong arcade hardware, with the goal of matching the system's powerful sprite capabilities in a home system. Nintendo wanted the Famicom to match the Donkey Kong arcade hardware, so they took a Donkey Kong arcade cabinet to semiconductor chip manufacturer Ricoh for analysis, which led to Ricoh producing the Picture Processing Unit (PPU) chip for the NES.

Emulation
The NES version was re-released as an unlockable game in Animal Crossing for the GameCube. It was also published on Virtual Console for the Wii, Wii U, and Nintendo 3DS. The Wii U version is also the last game that was released to celebrate the 30-year anniversary of the Japanese version of the NES, the Famicom. The original arcade version of the game appears in the Nintendo 64 game Donkey Kong 64, and must be beaten to finish the game. Nintendo released the NES version on the e-Reader and for the Game Boy Advance Classic NES Series in 2002 and 2004, respectively. In 2004, Namco released an arcade cabinet which contains Donkey Kong, Donkey Kong Jr., and Mario Bros.

Donkey Kong: Original Edition is a port based on the NES version that reinstates the cement factory stage and includes some intermission animations absent from the original NES version, which has only ever been released on the Virtual Console. It was preinstalled on 25th Anniversary PAL region red Wii systems, which were first released in Europe on October 29, 2010. In Japan, a download code for the game for Nintendo 3DS Virtual Console was sent to users who purchased New Super Mario Bros. 2 or Brain Age: Concentration Training from the Nintendo eShop from July 28 to September 2, 2012. In North America, a download code for the game for Nintendo 3DS Virtual Console was sent to users who purchased one of five select 3DS games on the Nintendo eShop and registered it on Club Nintendo from October 1, 2012, to January 6, 2013. In Europe and Australia, it was released for purchase on the Nintendo 3DS eShop in September 2014. The original arcade version was re-released as part of the Arcade Archives series for Nintendo Switch on June 14, 2018, and the NES version was re-released as one of the launch titles for Nintendo Switch Online on September 19.

Clones
Donkey Kong was one of the most widely cloned video games in the early 1980s, along with Space Invaders (1978) and Pac-Man (1980). By 1983, Donkey Kong clones had become available on various different platforms. The Giant List of Classic Game Programmers lists 17 different Donkey Kong clones released for various home platforms.

Crazy Kong was officially licensed from Nintendo and manufactured by Falcon for some non-US markets. Nevertheless, Crazy Kong machines found their way into some American arcades, often installed in cabinets marked as Congorilla. Nintendo was quick to take legal action against those distributing the game in the US. Bootleg copies of Donkey Kong also appeared in both North America and France under the Crazy Kong, Konkey Kong or Donkey King names. The 1982 Logger arcade game from Century Electronics is a direct clone of Donkey Kong, with a large bird standing in for the ape and rolling logs instead of barrels.

In 1981, O. R. Rissman, president of Tiger Electronics, obtained a license to use the name King Kong from Universal City Studios. Under this title, Tiger created a handheld LCD game with a scenario and gameplay based directly on Nintendo's creation.

Many home computer clones directly borrowed the gorilla theme: Killer Gorilla (BBC Micro, 1983), Killer Kong (ZX Spectrum, 1983), Crazy Kong 64 (Commodore 64, 1983), Kongo Kong (Commodore 64, 1983), Donkey King (TRS-80 Color Computer, 1983), and Kong (TI-99/4A, 1983). One of the first releases from Electronic Arts was Hard Hat Mack (Apple II, 1983), a three-stage game without an ape, but using the construction site setting from Donkey Kong. Other clones recast the game with different characters, such as Cannonball Blitz (Apple II, 1982), with a soldier and cannonballs replacing the ape and barrels, and the American Southwest-themed Canyon Climber (Atari 8-bit, 1982).

Epyx's Jumpman (Atari 8-bit, 1983) reuses a prototypical name for the Mario character in Donkey Kong. A magazine ad for the game has the tagline "If you liked Donkey Kong, you'll love JUMPMAN!" Jumpman, Miner 2049er (Atari 8-bit, 1982), and Mr. Robot and His Robot Factory (Atari 8-bit, 1984), focus on traversing all of the platforms in the level, or collecting scattered objects, instead of climbing to the top.

There were so many games with multiple ladder and platforms stages by 1983 that Electronic Games described Nintendo's own Popeye game as "yet another variation of a theme that's become all too familiar since the success of Donkey Kong". That year Sega released a Donkey Kong clone called Congo Bongo in arcades. Although using isometric perspective, the structure and gameplay are similar.

Nintendo attempted to take legal action against unauthorized clones of Donkey Kong, but estimated they lost  in potential sales to these clones. By 1990, Nintendo had successfully won over thirty lawsuits related to Donkey Kong. For example, Nintendo won a 1990 Japanese lawsuit against Falcon Company, which had sold 12,000 counterfeit arcade cabinets in the United States during the 1980s.

Sequels
Donkey Kong spawned the sequel Donkey Kong Jr. (1982) with the player controlling Donkey Kong's son in an attempt to save his father from Mario.

The 1983 spin-off Mario Bros. introduced Mario's brother Luigi in a single-screen cooperative game, set in a sewer, and launched the Mario franchise.

Also in 1983, Donkey Kong 3 appeared in the form of a fixed shooter, with an exterminator named Stanley ridding the ape—and insects—from a greenhouse.

Later games

Nintendo revived the Donkey Kong franchise in the 1990s for a series of platform games and spin-offs developed by Rare, beginning with Donkey Kong Country in 1994.

In 2004, Nintendo released Mario vs. Donkey Kong, a sequel to the Game Boy's Donkey Kong, in which Mario must chase Donkey Kong to get back the stolen Mini-Mario toys.

In the follow-up Mario vs. Donkey Kong 2: March of the Minis, Donkey Kong once again falls in love with Pauline and kidnaps her, and Mario uses the Mini-Mario toys to help him rescue her. Donkey Kong Racing for the GameCube was in development by Rare, but was canceled when Microsoft purchased the company. In 2004, Nintendo released the first of the Donkey Konga games, a rhythm-based game series that uses a special bongo controller. Donkey Kong Jungle Beat (2005) is a unique platform action game that uses the same bongo controller accessory.

In 2007, Donkey Kong Barrel Blast was released for the Nintendo Wii. It was originally developed as a GameCube game and would have used the bongo controller, but it was delayed and released exclusively as a Wii game with no support for the bongo accessory. The Donkey Kong Country series was revived by Retro Studios in 2010 with the release of Donkey Kong Country Returns, and its sequel, Donkey Kong Country: Tropical Freeze, in 2014.

Donkey Kong appears as a game in the Wii U game NES Remix, which features multiple NES games and sometimes "remixes" them by presenting significantly modified versions of the games as challenges. One such challenge features Link from The Legend of Zelda traveling through the first screen to save Pauline. The difficulty is increased compared to the original Donkey Kong because Link cannot jump, as in Zelda.

Super Smash Bros. Brawl and Super Smash Bros. for Wii U include a demo of the NES version of Donkey Kong, and a stage called "75m", a replica of its Donkey Kong namesake.

Popular culture
By late June 1982, Donkey Kongs success had prompted more than 50 parties in the U.S. and Japan to license the game's characters. Mario and his simian nemesis appeared on cereal boxes, board games, pajamas, and manga. In 1983, the animation studio Ruby-Spears produced a Donkey Kong cartoon (as well as Donkey Kong Jr.) for the Saturday Supercade program on CBS. In the show, mystery crime-solving plots in the mode of Scooby-Doo are framed around the premise of Mario and Pauline chasing Donkey Kong (voiced by Soupy Sales), who has escaped from the circus. The show lasted two seasons.

In 1982, the songs "Do the Donkey Kong" by Buckner & Garcia and "Donkey Kong" by R. Cade and the Video Victims were released. Artists like DJ Jazzy Jeff & the Fresh Prince and Trace Adkins referenced the game in songs. Episodes of The Simpsons, Futurama, Crank Yankers, and The Fairly OddParents have referenced the game. Sound effects from the Atari 2600 version serve as generic video game sounds in films and television series. The phrase "It's on like Donkey Kong" was coined by American rapper Ice Cube in 1992, and has been used in various works of popular culture. In November 2010, Nintendo applied for a trademark on the phrase with the United States Patent and Trademark Office.

Notes

References

Bibliography

 Consalvo, Mia (2003). "Hot Dates and Fairy-tale Romances". The Video Game Theory Reader. New York: Routledge.
 Fox, Matt (2006). The Video Games Guide. Boxtree Ltd.
 Mingo, Jack. (1994) How the Cadillac Got its Fins New York: HarperBusiness. 
 Schodt, Frederick L. (1996). Dreamland Japan: Writings on Modern Manga. Berkeley, California: Stone Bridge Press.

External links

 
 Donkey Kong at Arcade History

Donkey Kong platform games
Nintendo Research & Development 1 games
Video games designed by Shigeru Miyamoto
Video games directed by Shigeru Miyamoto
Video games produced by Gunpei Yokoi
Vertically-oriented video games
1981 video games
Apple II games
Arcade video games
Atari 2600 games
Atari 7800 games
Atari 8-bit family games
ColecoVision games
Commodore 64 games
VIC-20 games
Nintendo e-Reader games
Famicom Disk System games
Game & Watch games
Game Boy Advance games
Intellivision games
MSX games
Nintendo arcade games
Nintendo Entertainment System games
Nintendo Switch Online games
Nintendo Switch games
Pack-in video games
Single-player video games
TI-99/4A games
Video games developed in Japan
Virtual Console games for Nintendo 3DS
Virtual Console games for Wii
Virtual Console games for Wii U
ZX Spectrum games
World Video Game Hall of Fame
Hamster Corporation games